Marcos Nicolás Delía (born April 8, 1992) is an Argentine-Italian professional basketball player for BC Wolves of the Lithuanian Basketball League. He also represents the senior Argentina national basketball team internationally. He is a 2.11 m (6 ft 11 in) tall center, that can also play as a power forward, if needed.

Professional career
Delía played with Lanus Buenos Aires in Argentina during the 2008–09 season. He spent the 2009–10 season with Ciudad de Saladillo. He then moved to the Argentine club Boca Juniors in 2010, and he stayed there until 2014 when he moved to the Argentine club Obras Sanitarias.

In 2016, he moved to the Spanish League club UCAM Murcia. In the 2016–17 season, he debuted in EuroCup and averaged 3.6 points and 2.6 rebounds in 14 appearances. In the Spanish League, he made 32 appearances and averaged 5.7 points and 3.3 rebounds per game. In the 2017–18 season, he averaged 6.2 points and 3.9 rebounds over 34 Spanish League games. He started the 2018–19 season playing for UCAM Murcia and, in the mid-season, moved to Joventut. In 32 games of the Spanish League, he averaged 5.8 points and 3.1 rebounds per game for both clubs.

In the summer of 2019, he signed a contract with the reigning Mexican champions Fuerza Regia de Monterrey; however, after only a few months, in October he joined Virtus Bologna in the Lega Basket Serie A.

On October 12, 2020, he signed with Pallacanestro Trieste in the Italian Serie A.

On August 4, 2022, he has signed with BC Wolves of the Lithuanian Basketball League.

National team career
Delía was a member of the junior national teams of Argentina. With Argentina's junior national teams, he won the gold medal at the 2009 FIBA South America Under-17 Championship, where he won a gold medal, at the 2010 FIBA Americas Under-18 Championship, and at the 2011 FIBA Under-19 World Championship.

He has also been a member of the senior men's Argentine national basketball team. With the senior Argentine national team, he has won medals at the following tournaments: the 2012 South American Championship, where he won a gold medal; the 2014 South American Championship, where he won a silver medal, the 2013 FIBA Americas Championship, where he won a bronze medal, and the 2015 FIBA Americas Championship, where he won a silver medal.

He has also played with Argentina's senior national team at the following tournaments: the 2011 Pan American Games and the 2015 Pan American Games, the 2014 FIBA Basketball World Cup, 2016 South American Championship, and the 2016 Summer Olympics.

In 2019, he participated in the team that won the Pan American gold medal in Lima. He was included in the Argentine squad for the 2019 FIBA Basketball World Cup and clinched the silver medal with Argentina, which emerged as runners-up to Spain at the 2019 FIBA Basketball World Cup.

In 2022, Delía won the gold medal in the 2022 FIBA AmeriCup held in Recife, Brazil. He was Argentina´s starting center in the tournament.

References

External links
 Marcos Delía at acb.com 
 Marcos Delía at euroleague.net
 Marcos Delía at fiba.com (archive)
 Marcos Delía at latinbasket.com
 
 Marcos Delía at abcsaladillo.com.ar

1992 births
Living people
2014 FIBA Basketball World Cup players
2019 FIBA Basketball World Cup players
Argentine expatriate basketball people in Spain
Argentine men's basketball players
Argentine people of Italian descent
Basketball players at the 2011 Pan American Games
Basketball players at the 2015 Pan American Games
Basketball players at the 2016 Summer Olympics
Basketball players at the 2019 Pan American Games
Basketball players at the 2020 Summer Olympics
BC Wolves players
Boca Juniors basketball players
CB Murcia players
Centers (basketball)
Italian expatriate basketball people in Spain
Italian men's basketball players
Joventut Badalona players
Lega Basket Serie A players
Liga ACB players
Medalists at the 2019 Pan American Games
Obras Sanitarias basketball players
Olympic basketball players of Argentina
Pallacanestro Trieste players
Pan American Games gold medalists for Argentina
Pan American Games medalists in basketball
Power forwards (basketball)
Sportspeople from Buenos Aires Province